Bartolomé Calatayud (8 September 1882– 11 April 1973) was a Spanish classical guitar composer, teacher and performer. He was born in 1882 on the island of Mallorca. In 1899, while still a teenager, he was awarded the Diploma of Honour 1st Class by the Workers Instructive Centre Palma for his "superior musical knowledge in guitar playing." A contemporary and friend of Miguel Llobet and Andrés Segovia, he studied guitar first with Pedro Antonio Alemany Palmer (Palma 1862–1952), and then with Antonio Gomez Melters (1839–1908). He studied harmony and composition with the great Majorcan musicologist and composer D. Antonio Noguera. Bartolomé was also taught by Francisco Tárrega in Valencia.

He gave concerts in Spain, France, Switzerland, Portugal and Algiers and toured South America with Spanish Chorus and Dance groups. In Majorca he composed many works for the classical guitar and taught the instrument. Many of his guitar works are based on popular Catalan/Majorcan folk music.

Although less famous in the classical guitar world, Bartolomé Calatayud has left much enjoyable and exciting music written for classical guitarists of all abilities. He taught many pupils in Majorca during his final years. He died in 1973 at the age of 90.
For more pictures of the composer, refer to the Spanish site guitarramalp and laguitarrabalear.

Works for guitar 
 Alegre Campina E Major
 Alegre Primavera E Major
 Boceto Andaluz
 Cuatro Piezas Faciles Para Guitarra: Vals, Cancion De Cuna, Romanza, Pasodoblillo
 Cuatro Juguetes: Boceto Andaluz, Gavotta, Danza, Minueto
 Cubanita A Major
 Danza Espanola E Minor
 Danza Popular De Campdevanol A Major
 Dos Piezas Para Guitarra: Bolero, El Majo
 Dos Piezas Para Guitarra: Bagatela, Gavota
 Estampa Gitana D Minor
 Galop G Major
 Gavota Facil A Major
 Guarjirita - Sobre Temas Populares D Major
 Habanera A Minor
 Marcha Hungara A Minor
 Marcha Militar A Major
 Minueto E Major
 Nostalgia E Minor
 Pequena Tarantela F# Minor
 Sonatina No. 1 A Minor
 Sonatina No. 2 D Minor
 Suite Antiqua: Antante, Zarabanda, Pavana, Minueto, Rondino
 Tango Argentino A Minor
 Tango D Major
 Tres Canciones Populares Catalanas: Muntanyes Regalades, La Preso De Lleida, La Pastoreta
 Tres Piezas Faciles Para Guitarra: Cajita De Musica, Divertimento, Melodia
 Tres Piezas Para Guitarra: Mazurka, Caramba!(Habanera), Canconeta
 Tres Piezas Para Guitarra: Lamento Gitano - Solea, Fandanguillo, Bulerias
 Triptico Para Una Dama: Bondad, Simpatia, Alegria
 Una Caricia E Major
 Vals E Minor
 Vals Y Mazurka
 Zambra D Minor

His works are mostly published by Unión Musical Ediciones, Madrid

References 

Spanish composers
Spanish male composers
1882 births
1973 deaths
People from Mallorca
Spanish classical guitarists
Spanish male guitarists
Musicians from the Balearic Islands
20th-century guitarists
20th-century Spanish male musicians